W90-Mattensprunganlage is a ski jumping normal hill in Ramsau am Dachstein, Austria.

History
It was opened in 1995 and owned by WSV Ramsau. It has hosted one FIS Ski jumping World Cup event each for men and women, in 1998 and 2012 respectively, as well as events at the FIS Nordic World Ski Championships 1999. Daito Takahashi holds the hill record.

World Cup

Men

Ladies 

Ski jumping venues in Austria
Sport in Austria
Sports venues completed in 1995